Trillium Health Partners is a hospital system which serves Mississauga and western Toronto in the Canadian province of Ontario. It comprises the Credit Valley Hospital, Mississauga Hospital, and Queensway Health Centre. Trillium Health Partners is Canada's largest community-based, academically affiliated hospital, and has the largest emergency department in the country. Trillium Health Partners is affiliated with the University of Toronto and, in partnership with the University of Toronto Mississauga, jointly created the Mississauga Academy of Medicine.

Formation
Trillium Health Partners was formed with the amalgamation of the Trillium Health Centre and the Credit Valley Hospital on December 1, 2011. The two-site Trillium Health Centre was itself the result of a 1998 amalgamation between Mississauga Hospital (established 1958 as South Peel Hospital) and Queensway General Hospital (established 1956).

Constituent hospitals

Credit Valley Hospital

Credit Valley Hospital (founded 1985) is a 365-bed regional hospital serving the northern neighbourhoods of Mississauga. It is equipped with a helipad for air ambulance services.

Mississauga Hospital

Mississauga Hospital (founded 1958 as South Peel Hospital) is a 751-bed regional hospital serving the central and southern neighbourhoods of Mississauga. It also is the site of regional stroke, cancer, cardiovascular health and cardiac surgery, as well as neurological care centres.

Queensway Health Centre

Queensway Health Centre (founded 1956 as Queensway General Hospital) is the ambulatory care centre for the hospital group. It provides urgent care (non-emergency) to residents of western Toronto and central-southern Mississauga, relieving pressure on the emergency room at Mississauga Hospital and other nearby hospitals. The Queensway Health Centre is also the site of rehabilitation services, a Complex Continuing Care unit, the Betty Wallace Women's Health Clinic, and the Kingsway Financial Spine Centre.

In 2022, Trillium received a $105 million donation from the Peter Gilgan Foundation, for this hospital and Mississauga Hospital. After the expansion is complete, it will be known as the Gilgan Family Queensway Health Centre.

Charitable foundation
Trillium Health Partners' work of providing health care is supported by the fundraising efforts of the Trillium Health Partners Foundation, which was formed through the merger of the Credit Valley Hospital Foundation and the Trillium Health Centre Foundation in 2013.

Notes

Hospital networks in Canada

2011 establishments in Ontario